John Thomson is a former Welsh international lawn bowls player.

Bowls career
He won a bronze medal in the men's fours at the 1978 Commonwealth Games in Edmonton with Ellis Stanbury, Gwyn Evans and Ian Sutherland.

References

Welsh male bowls players
Commonwealth Games bronze medallists for Wales
Bowls players at the 1978 Commonwealth Games
Commonwealth Games medallists in lawn bowls
Medallists at the 1978 Commonwealth Games